The Trans-Alay Range (also 'Trans Alai') is the northernmost range of the Pamir Mountain System.

Geography
The Trans-Alay is located in the area where the Pamirs and the Tian Shan come together. This heavily glaciated range forms the border between Gorno-Badakshan region in Tajikistan and Osh Region, Kyrgyzstan, stretching eastwards until the border with China. To the north lies the Alay Valley and to the south, the river Muksu.

Peaks
The highest peak in the range is 7,134 m high Lenin Peak. 
The Kyzylart and Ters-Agar mountain passes geographically divide the range into three parts: the western —highest peak  (5,900 m), the central —with some of the highest summits, including Lenin Peak,  (6717 m),  ( 6780  m), and Marshal Zhukov Peak (6,842 m), and the eastern — highest peak Kurumdy I summit (6,614 m).

See also
List of mountains in Tajikistan

References

Mountain ranges of Kyrgyzstan
Mountain ranges of Tajikistan
Kyrgyzstan–Tajikistan border
Pamir Mountains